Mark Cocker (born 14 June 1982) is a freestyle wrestler, Ju-Jitsu and Judo player 
who trains with Bolton Olympic Wrestling Club. Cocker is a British and English freestyle wrestling champion and has competed for England and Great Britain for fifteen years. He is also a 1st Dan black belt in Judo under Steve Pullen MBE and 1st Dan Black Belt in Ju-Jitsu under Professor Trevor Roberts.

Early career

Cocker first got into martial arts after training with local instructor Trevor Roberts, and gained his 1st dan black belt in Roberts' Tetsu-no-otoko-ryu style of Ju-Jitsu. After showing a flair for grappling, Roberts began to coach him in the Russian style of combat known as Sambo wrestling and eventually, he began to train at his local wrestling club in Bolton. Cocker's junior career saw him take regional and national titles and he was chosen to represent Great Britain in the World Cadet Championships in 1998 held at the then Nynex Arena in Manchester. He placed 14th in the world.

Senior career

After a successful Junior career, Cocker moved into the senior ranks winning and medalling in numerous domestic and international tournaments. In 2002, he narrowly lost a 'wrestle off' for the English 2002 Commonwealth Games team to a former South African wrestler who gained eligibility to wrestle for England. Cocker attended the 2002 Games as 96 kg reserve. 2002 also saw him place 7th in the FISU World University Wrestling Championships and he was the first British wrestler to ever compete at this event. 
Cocker continued to compete domestically and internationally until late 2004. He then began to cross train in other sports including a return to Ju-Jitsu and Judo. He transferred his wrestling skills onto the Judo mat training under Steve Pullen at Urmston Judo club and gained his 1st Dan black belt in Judo, represented the North West in the National Team Championships, and secured a bronze medal in the 2008 Heart of England Judo Championships.

Return to competition

In late 2008, Cocker resumed his freestyle wrestling career and began training again at Bolton Olympic Wrestling club. What made Cocker stand out from other elite British wrestlers was his part-time status, receiving no funding as he developed his career in teaching. He made his competitive comeback in the 2009 British Open wrestling championships winning the bronze medal in the 120 kg weight division. He went on to win the 2010 English Open Championships at the 120 kg weight division and placed second in the 2010 British Closed championships. In July 2010, Cocker was chosen to represent Great Britain at the UK Sport funded GB World Cup event held in Sheffield and won the silver medal, beating wrestlers from Uzbekistan and Latvia to reach the final.

2010 Commonwealth Games

In August 2010, Cocker was victorious in a final 'wrestle off 'against the Great Britain international and Commonwealth Games bronze medallist Chinu Xxx, at the 120 kg weight division, to decide who should represent Team England in the 2010 Commonwealth Games to be held in Delhi. The 'wrestle off' was a 'best of three' series of matches held at the Salford Wrestling academy, the same venue that he had lost his 2002 Commonwealth Games 'wrestle off'. Cocker won both matches and was selected to represent Team England in both the Greco-Roman and Freestyle disciplines making him the only English wrestler to ever compete at a Commonwealth Games in both styles. Cocker was knocked out in the semi-final stage, finishing 5th in both styles.

Senior career continued

In 2011, Cocker won the 2011 British Open Championships, represented Great Britain at the FILA 2011 European Wrestling Championships held in Dortmund (Germany), was selected to compete in the 2012 London Olympics test event  (unable to compete due to injury) and placed second in the 2012 British Open Championships. During 2013 Cocker again won the British Open Championships (the first Team England qualifier for the 2014 Commonwealth Games)  beating the Poland international T. Bujak 7–0 in the final before being selected to represent Great Britain at the FILA International Olympia Tournament in Greece where he secured a bronze medal. In 2014 Cocker won a silver medal in the English Open Wrestling Championships (120 kg category) before dropping to the 97 kg weight category and winning the British Closed Wrestling Championships.

The 2014 British Open Wrestling Championships
On 11 May 2014 Cocker placed third at the 2014 British Open Wrestling Championships (the final qualifier for the 2014 Commonwealth Games), losing only one bout to the eventual winner of the tournament. Subsequently, Cocker was not nominated for selection to the 2014 England Commonwealth Games team. In August 2014 it was discovered that the winner of Cocker's weight failed a drugs test at the 2014 British Open and was found guilty of a doping violation resulting in a two-year ban from all competitions. The British Wrestling Association anti-doping policy would mean that no final positions were amended however the athlete who had failed the test was removed from the official results effectively moving Cocker to second in the final standings (behind the athlete he had previously defeated by points superiority in the 2014 British Closed Championships). In January 2015, after a successful complaint and mediation process with the British Wrestling Association, Cocker received an apology from the National Governing Body for any confusion or distress they had caused him due to a failure to follow its own anti-doping policy following the violation at the 2014 British Championships.

The 2017 British Open Wrestling Championships
 On 4 November 2017 after a three and  a half year absence from competition, Cocker entered the 2017 British Open Wrestling Championships held in Nottingham. The event was also the final 2018 Commonwealth Games qualifier.  Cocker, at 35 years old was an eligible 'Masters' age category competitor, but competed in the 125 kg senior open age category. Cocker won all his matches by either points superiority or pin. Cocker secured notable wins over Mandhir Kooner (Commonwealth Games bronze medallist) and Richard Tuke, suplexing and pinning his opponent in the final bout. The competition was reported to be Cocker's final open age category entry.

Achievements on return to competition

International results

Teacher
Mark Cocker was an Assistant & Deputy Headteacher at Sale High School, Manchester. In January 2016 he moved to Pleckgate High School, Blackburn as Headteacher. In January 2019, Pleckgate High School was rated as outstanding by Ofsted in all categories.

Documentary
In 2002, Cocker was part of a documentary 'Catch – The Hold Not Taken' that was created to investigate the roots of different styles of wrestling such as freestyle and Catch wrestling, and how wrestling has evolved over the decades. The documentary starred Cocker alongside UFC veteran Dan Severn and Olympic Gold Medallist Dan Gable.

Elite Athlete Coaching
Cocker is an accredited UKCC level 2 coach, predominantly coaching wrestling to elite wrestlers and mixed martial artists. Notable athlete associations include UFC competitor, BAMMA world champion and KSW world champion Scott Askham and BAMMA world champion and UFC competitor Marc Diakiese who have both trained with Cocker. Cocker has also coached the 2019 & 2022 British Freestyle Wrestling champion at 97 kg, Ash Roden.

References

Living people
1982 births
British male sport wrestlers
English male judoka
Sportspeople from Bolton
English male wrestlers
Wrestlers at the 2010 Commonwealth Games
Commonwealth Games competitors for England